Dedeli is a village in the municipality of Valandovo, North Macedonia.

Demographics
According to the 2002 census, the village had a total of 220 inhabitants. Ethnic groups in the village include:

Turks 212
Romani 3 
Others 5

References

External links

Villages in Valandovo Municipality
Turkish communities in North Macedonia